Matthew James Clowry (born c. 1975) is an Australian former professional basketball player who played one season in the National Basketball League (NBL) for the Canberra Cannons.

Clowry was a graduate of the ACT Academy of Sport program and was a pupil at Marist College Canberra. Clowry joined the Cannons in February 1995 after Brett Flanigan invited him to training camp. He had previously played for ACT under 20s in the 1994 Australian championships and the under-18s in 1992. He also played for the Canberra Gunners of the Continental Basketball Association (CBA) in 1995. He was named the Cannons' best defensive player at their end of season awards in 1995.

Clowry also played rugby union and was part of the Australian squad for a match against a Scotland Schools team.

References

External links
NBL statistics

1970s births
Living people
Australian men's basketball players
Canberra Cannons players
Shooting guards
Small forwards
Sportspeople from Canberra